The Tall Man is a 2011 Australian documentary film directed by Tony Krawitz. It is about the death of Cameron "Mulrunji" Doomadgee in police custody on Great Palm Island, Palm Islands, Queensland on 19 November 2004.

The film premiered at the 2011 Adelaide Film Festival on 2 March 2011.

Synopsis
The Tall Man explores the community reaction and events surrounding the death of Cameron Doomadgee, a 36-year-old Palm Island man who, while walking home intoxicated singing his favourite song Who Let the Dogs Out?, was arrested for harassing and attacking public bystanders. Doomadgee was arrested by Sergeant Chris Hurley, or 'the tall man', and was 45 minutes later found dead in police custody with his liver almost split in two, four broken ribs, a ruptured spleen, severe bruising to his head and a torn portal vein. The police claimed that his death was caused by him tripping on a step and colluded to protect Chris Hurley from facing any charges over the incident.

In response to the news that police were claiming Doomadgee's death was the result of an accidental fall, up to 200 Palm Islanders rioted and burnt down the local police station, adjoining courthouse and police barracks. 80 reinforcement police officers carrying machine guns were flown in by helicopter to the island and 28 locals were arrested. Almost all of the 28 locals served jail sentences.

Due to media attention and public protests, manslaughter charges were laid against Chris Hurley, making him the first police officer in Australian history to even have to appear in court for the death of an Aboriginal Australian in police custody.

Believing themselves to be above the law and not required to be accountable for their actions, police around Australia staged protests demanding that Chris Hurley should not face prosecution. Although Chris Hurley was found not guilty at his trial, a final inquest by Coroner Brian Hine delivered an open finding, that Doomadgee was assaulted, but police collusion on evidence meant that he could not determine if the death was deliberate or accidental.

Cast
Tracey Twaddle as herself
Andrew Boe as himself
Murrandoo Yanner as himself
TJ Yanner as himself
Erykah Kyle as herself
Lloyd Doomadgee as himself
Elizabeth Doomadgee as herself
Jane Doomadgee as herself
Tony Koch as himself
Clinton Leahy as himself

Production

Script
The film's script was based on the book The Tall Man by Chloe Hooper.

Casting
The film aims to include Aboriginal Australians telling their own stories in their own voices, in accordance with Blackfella Films's main objective.

Despite months of negotiations, the Queensland Police Service declined to be involved and no members of the Queensland Police were willing to be interviewed.

Release
The film premiered at the 2011 edition of the Adelaide Film Festival on 2 March 2011, and was also selected for the Toronto International Film Festival in the same year, before being released in cinemas across Australia by Hopscotch/eOne from 17 November 2011. It was first broadcast on SBS Television in 2012.

It was shown on 1 May 2021 on NITV, and thereafter streaming on SBS On Demand.

Reviews
Margaret Pomeranz described The Tall Man as "one of the most explosive stories of our time".

Awards

In 2014 the film was selected by the Australian Directors Guild for entry to the Directors Guild of America's Directors Finder Series.

See also
2004 Palm Island death in custody
Aboriginal deaths in custody
Institutional Racism
Blackfella Films

References

Further reading

External links

The critical events of the Mulrunji case on Palm Island

2011 films
2011 documentary films
Australian documentary films
Films set in Queensland
Documentary films about Aboriginal Australians
Crime films based on actual events
Documentary films about law enforcement
Films about police brutality
Documentary films about crime
2010s English-language films